They Missed the Perfume is a Disco Biscuits studio album from 2001.

Reception

Allmusic gave the album a generally positive review. Admitting that "Occasionally, the arrangements venture into trite post-hippie anthemia", they nonetheless concluded that "the disc continues to yield surprises far beyond most studio releases of the genre."

Track listing

"Highwire" – 3:57
"Spacebirdmatingcall" – 8:24
"Haleakala Crater" – 11:20
"Home Again" – 5:44
"Mindless Dribble" – 13:41
"I Remember When" – 8:14

References

2001 albums
Disco Biscuits albums